Pisidium clessini is a species of extinct freshwater bivalve from family Sphaeriidae.

Description
The shell has an oval form with somewhat prominent umbo, that is situated behind the middle. There is a distinct concentric rib structure. The ribs are sharp and are separated by relatively big spaces. There are two (sometimes three) strong accentuated ribs near the Umbo, that gradually become less accentuated to the sides. These ribs are a distinct characteristic of the species. The ribs can be faded in certain cases, but the accentuated ribs are always there. Radial ribs are not present. The inner rim of the shell is smooth and is not crenulated.
The shell of this species has a somewhat variable shape and sometimes does look a lot like Pisidium amnicum.

Measurements of the shell:
length: up to 7,8 mm.
width: up to 6,5 mm.
semi diameter: up to 2,2 mm.

Ecology
Pisidium clessini only lived in streaming and moving water.

Distribution
The species is extinct, but was widely spread in Europe from the beginning of the Pliocene, but mainly during interglacials of the early and middle Pleistocene.

References

  , 1998. De Nederlandse zoetwatermollusken. Recente en fossiele weekdieren uit zoet en brak water. Nederlandse Fauna 2. Nationaal Natuurhistorisch Museum Naturalis, KNNV Uitgeverij & EIS-Nederland, Leiden, 288 pp. 
 Danish , 1904. Om den fossile kvartaere molluskfauna i Danmark og dens relationer til forandringer i klimaet. Land- og ferskvandsmolluskfaunaen. København, I_IV, 1-136. 
  , 1990. Notes on Quaternary freshwater mollusca of the Netherlands, with descriptions of some new species. Mededelingen van de Werkgroep voor Tertiaire en Kwartaire Geologie, 26(1989): 145-181.
  , 1995. Malacological evidence relating to the insularity of the British Isles during the Quaternary. In Island Britain: a Quaternary perspective. Preece, R.C. (ed.) Geological Society Special Publication No. 96: 89-110.
  , 1950. Nederland in het IJstijdvak. Utrecht. 289 pp.
 Danish , 1929. Zur Geschichte und Verbreitung des Pisidium clessini Neumayr (= astartoides Sandberger). Archiv für Molluskenkunde, 61: 185-189.

External links

clessini